Qala or qal'a may refer to: 

 Qala, Azerbaijan
 Qala, Malta, a village on Gozo Island, Malta

It may also refer to:
 Qala (film), a 2022 Indian Hindi-language film

See also
 Kala (disambiguation), Persian alternate spelling of Arabic qal'a
 Qalat (disambiguation), places whose names contain the words Qalat, Qelat, Kalat, Kalaat, Kalut, or Kelat 
 Qalat (fortress)
 Qila (disambiguation), Persian (Urdu, Hindi) variant of Arabic qal'a